Requiem Survey, a website established in 2003 by Reformed Christian rector, literary scholar and author Kees van der Vloed (born 9 June 1960 in the Netherlands), endeavors to categorize all composers and works relating to the Mass for the dead. As of 2019 the repository includes 3,294 composers and 5,266 works. The specialized encyclopedia also lists Vloed's personal music library, which is "focused on work directly related to the Latin text and its implementation excluding evocative work, but as promiscuous as Henze’s Requiem (a cycle of nine sacred concerts), Hindemith (on texts by Whitman) and Weinberg (on texts by various poets, e.g., Lorca and Fukagawa)."

The alphabetical survey itself recognizes classical, vocal requiems and their composers, including fragments and unfinished works in the original Latin text as well as in other languages (e.g., German requiems), requiem-songs, motets and profane requiems. Instrumental works are not included. Thousands of profiled composers range from Guillaume Du Fay and Johannes Ockeghem, of the early Renaissance, to such well-known Classical era figures as Mozart and J. C. Bach, to Verdi and Brahms of the Romantic era, to 20th and 21st century figures such as Benjamin Britten, David Woodard and Gavin Bryars.

Size, readership and site traffic
Since its inception, Requiem Survey has received an audience of more than 75 million readers.

References

External links
 Official website

2003 establishments in the Netherlands
Dutch music websites
Internet properties established in 2003